Ian Masson is a former association football player who represented New Zealand at international level.

Career
Masson made his full New Zealand debut in a 1-1 draw with Fiji on 20 October 1980 and ended his international playing career with four official A-international caps to his credit, his final cap an appearance in a 1-1 draw with Sudan on 9 June 1983.

References 

Year of birth missing (living people)
Living people
New Zealand association footballers
New Zealand international footballers
Association footballers not categorized by position